Mirhani Hashemi (born 21 March 1983 in Sari, Iran) is an Iranian footballer who currently plays for Siah Jamegan.

Professional
Sabri joined Moghavemat Sepasi in 2008 after spending the previous three years at Bargh Shiraz.

Club career statistics

 Assist Goals

References

1983 births
Living people
Iranian footballers
Fajr Sepasi players
Bargh Shiraz players
Rah Ahan players
Shahr Khodro F.C. players
Persian Gulf Pro League players
Sportspeople from Sari, Iran
Association football defenders